Dembélé is a surname of West African origin, found mostly in Mali and bordering countries.

People with this surname
 Bassirou Dembélé (born 1990), Malian footballer
 Bira Dembélé (born 1988), French footballer
 Boubacar Dembélé (born 1982), French footballer
 Fatoumata Dembélé Diarra, Malian judge
 Garra Dembélé (born 1986), French-born Malian footballer
 Habib Dembélé (born 1962), Malian comedian, writer and actor
 Habiba Dembélé, Ivorian TV journalist
 Karamoko Dembele (born 2003), British footballer
 Makan Dembélé (born 1986), Malian footballer
 Malaly Dembélé (born 1997), French footballer
 Mana Dembélé (born 1988), French footballer
 Mousa Dembélé (born 1987), Belgian footballer
 Moussa Dembélé (French footballer) (born 1996), French footballer
 Moussa Dembélé (hurdler) (born 1988), Senegalese athlete
 Ousmane Dembélé (born 1997), French footballer
 Siraba Dembélé Pavlović (born 1986), French handballer
 Siramana Dembélé (born 1977), French footballer
 Siriki Dembélé (born 1996), English-born Ivorian footballer
 Souleymane Dembélé (born 1984), Malian footballer

Surnames of African origin